"I Thought About You" is a 1939 popular song composed by Jimmy Van Heusen with lyrics by Johnny Mercer.

Background
It was one of three collaborations Van Heusen and Mercer wrote for the Mercer-Morris publishing company started by Mercer and former Warner Bros. publisher Buddy Morris. The other two were called "Blue Rain" and "Make with the Kisses". "I Thought About You" was by far the most popular of the songs. 

The lyrics were inspired by Mercer's train trip to Chicago. The first line is literally: "I took a trip on a train." Mercer said about the song:

"I can remember the afternoon that we wrote it. He [Van Heusen] played me the melody. I didn't have any idea, but I had to go to Chicago that night. I think I was on the Benny Goodman program. And I got to thinking about it on the train. I was awake, I couldn't sleep. The tune was running through my mind, and that's when I wrote the song. On the train, really going to Chicago."

Mercer wrote other songs about trains, including "Blues in the Night" (1940) and "On the Atchison, Topeka and the Santa Fe" (1946).

Other recordings 
 Bob Berg – In the Shadows
 Kenny Burrell with Coleman Hawkins – Bluesy Burrell (1962)
 Uri Caine – Live at the Village Vanguard (2003)
 Miles Davis – Someday My Prince Will Come (1961)
 Stan Getz with Kenny Barron – Voyage
 Benny Goodman with Mildred Bailey – 1939
 Johnny Hartman - And I Thought About You (1959)
 Billie Holiday with Bobby Tucker – Recital (1954)
 Shirley Horn - I Thought About You (1987)
 Branford Marsalis with Kenny Kirkland – Random Abstract
 Carmen McRae – The Great American Songbook (1972)
Diane Schuur and Johnny Smith
 Frank Sinatra – Songs for Swingin' Lovers! (1956)
 David Bowie – "I Took a Trip on a Gemini Spaceship" from Heathen (2002)

References

See also
List of 1930s jazz standards

1939 songs
1930s jazz standards
Songs with lyrics by Johnny Mercer
Songs with music by Jimmy Van Heusen
Mildred Bailey songs